BoBoiBoy Galaxy is a Malaysian animated television series. It is a sequel to BoBoiBoy focusing more on story-based adventures with different arcs every few episodes.

The series took place after BoBoiBoy and the first film, BoBoiBoy: The Movie. It began airing its first season with 24 episodes from November 2016 to June 2018. The first season is followed by the second film BoBoiBoy Movie 2.

Synopsis 
The series focuses on Power Spheras, robots created to give great power to their owners. However, the Power Sphera project was eventually considered dangerous and cancelled, and many of the Power Spheras fled and hid across the galaxy. Coveted by many, various aliens have been trying to find and capture the Power Spheras for their own benefit.

To prevent the Power Spheras from falling into the wrong hands, a young hero from Earth, BoBoiBoy, and his friends are assigned to track and protect Power Spheras that are scattered throughout the galaxy with the help of the intergalactic organisation, T.A.P.O.P.S. (Tracker And Protector Of Power Spheras)

Cast 
 Nur Fathiah Diaz as BoBoiBoy
 Muhammad Abdurrahman Solahuddin as Ochobot
 Dzubir Mohammed Zakaria as Gopal
 Nur Sarah Alisya as Yaya
 Yap Ee Jean as Ying
 Wong Wai Kay as Fang
 Nizam Razak as Papa Zola
 Anas Abdul Aziz as Tok Aba, Koko Ci, Adu Du, Probe, Mr. Kumar
 Sharifah Sarah Syed Idros as Adu Du's Computer
 Mohd Ariff Abd Rahman as MotoBot
 Nur Iman Andaliz as Admiral Tarung
 Wong Pak Lin as Hang Kasa

English dub 
 Marsya Danialla Razak as BoBoiBoy
 Ilhan Mohd Shahrizal as Ochobot
 Ryan Lee Bhaskaran as Gopal
 Puteri Sabrina Affenddy as Yaya
 Chan Su Ling as Ying
 Wong Wai Kay as Fang
 Anas Abdul Aziz as Tok Aba, Koko Ci, Adu Du, Probe, Papa Zola, Gopal's dad
 Adila Shakir as Adu Du's Computer
 Azman Zukiply as MotoBot

Production 
Nizam Razak, the creator of BoBoiBoy, said that the idea of changing the storyline came in 2014 when he was in Japan. He was impressed with the diversity of Pokémon merchandise, getting the idea to diversify the Power Spheres. They started making the series after the end of BoBoiBoy mid-2016 and changed the storyline to be more active where BoBoiBoy would travel around the galaxy instead of waiting for enemies to come to Earth. The series takes place one to two years after the original series, although the target audience is still 7 to 18 year olds.

Release 
Animonsta Studios unofficially announced BoBoiBoy Galaxy in 2013 where they released a picture of a BoBoiBoy Galaxy poster featuring what was believed to be new costumes for BoBoiBoy Blaze and BoBoiBoy Ice. Animonsta later revealed their plans for BoBoiBoy Galaxy on their website.

Animonsta Studios then officially announced on their Facebook account that BoBoiBoy Galaxy would be aired in June 2016. After BoBoiBoy: The Movie, they made a new and detailed announcement: the storyline will feature the heroes travelling across the galaxy to search for Power Spheras and will take place 2 to 3 years after BoBoiBoy: The Movie. Animonsta will also release the comic first, before the animated series. They also announced that production will start soon and they expect to release the first batch of episodes between September and December 2016.

In July 2016, they announced that BoBoiBoy Galaxy will start airing during year-end school holidays in Malaysia on TV3 while the broadcast for MNCTV in Indonesia will start in January 2017.

In YouTube, the series was distributed by London-based company Moonbug Entertainment via Moonbug – Kids TV Shows Full Episodes and Moonbug Kids – Superheroes channels.

Media

Series

The first season consists of 24 episodes. The first episode was broadcast on 25 November 2016, with new episodes broadcast on TV3 and Mediacorp Suria. The first six episodes were broadcast consecutively. It aired on Disney Channel Southeast Asia on 7 July 2017, on MNCTV in January 2017 and February 3, 2017, on its official YouTube channel. The first season concluded on 21 June 2018 in Malaysia and June 23, 2018, in Indonesia after 24 episodes. On June–December 2019 Monsta uploaded 13 episodes for English dub on the official YouTube channel.

Movie

It is the second film in the BoBoiBoy franchise from Animonsta Studios. It is a standalone sequel to BoBoiBoy: The Movie (2016) and first season of TV series BoBoiBoy Galaxy. It is co-written by Nizam himself and Anas Abdul Aziz. This is the first film to use settings and characters from BoBoiBoy Galaxy.

It was released simultaneously in 4 countries, including Malaysia, Indonesia, Brunei, and Singapore on 8 August 2019. The film was released in Vietnam on 30 August 2019.

Comics

Season 1

Season 2

References

External links 
 BoBoiBoy Galaxy Official website
 

Malaysian children's animated action television series
Malaysian children's animated adventure television series
Malaysian children's animated comic science fiction television series
Malaysian children's animated superhero television series
Child superheroes
Animonsta Studios
Animated television series about children
Television series about cloning